Patricia Crowther may refer to:

Patricia Crowther (caver) (born 1943), American cave explorer and cave surveyor
Patricia Crowther (Wiccan) (born 1927), occultist

See also
Crowther (surname)